Janaka Siriwardane (born 13 June 1979) is a Sri Lankan former cricketer. He played in 43 first-class and 33 List A matches between 1998/99 and 2004/05. He made his Twenty20 debut on 17 August 2004, for Sebastianites Cricket and Athletic Club in the 2004 SLC Twenty20 Tournament.

References

External links
 

1979 births
Living people
Sri Lankan cricketers
Chilaw Marians Cricket Club cricketers
Colombo Cricket Club cricketers
Sebastianites Cricket and Athletic Club cricketers
Place of birth missing (living people)